Jairo Alonso Penaranda (born June 15, 1958) is a Colombian former American football running back for the Los Angeles Rams and the Philadelphia Eagles of the National Football League (NFL).  He also played in the United States Football League (USFL) for the Oakland Invaders and Memphis Showboats.  Penaranda played college football at the University of California, Los Angeles and was drafted in the 12th round of the 1981 NFL draft. He is distinguished as being the first Colombian to play in the National Football League.

Jairo additionally coached football- first as a graduate assistant with Southern Cal Trojans helping with special teams and linebackers. He then followed John Robinson and returned to LA to work with the Rams; as an assistant before being promoted to special teams coordinator.

References

1958 births
Living people
American football running backs
Colombian players of American football
Los Angeles Rams players
Memphis Showboats players
Oakland Invaders players
Philadelphia Eagles players
UCLA Bruins football players
Sportspeople from Barranquilla
USC Trojans football coaches
Los Angeles Rams coaches